An antifungal medication, also known as an antimycotic medication, is a pharmaceutical fungicide or fungistatic used to treat and prevent mycosis such as athlete's foot, ringworm, candidiasis (thrush), serious systemic infections such as cryptococcal meningitis, and others. Such drugs are usually obtained by a doctor's prescription, but a few are available over the counter (OTC).

Types of antifungal
There are two types of antifungals: local and systemic. Local antifungals are usually administered topically or vaginally, depending on the condition being treated. Systemic antifungals are administered orally or intravenously.

Of the clinically employed azole antifungals, only a handful are used systemically. These include ketoconazole, itraconazole, fluconazole, fosfluconazole, voriconazole, posaconazole, and isavuconazole. Examples of non-azole systemic antifungals include griseofulvin and terbinafine.

Classes

Polyenes

A polyene is a molecule with multiple conjugated double bonds. A polyene antifungal is a macrocyclic polyene with a heavily hydroxylated region on the ring opposite the conjugated system. This makes polyene antifungals amphiphilic. The polyene antimycotics bind with sterols in the fungal cell membrane, principally ergosterol. This changes the transition temperature (Tg) of the cell membrane, thereby placing the membrane in a less fluid, more crystalline state. (In ordinary circumstances membrane sterols increase the packing of the phospholipid bilayer making the plasma membrane more dense.) As a result, the cell's contents including monovalent ions (K+, Na+, H+, and Cl−) and small organic molecules leak, which is regarded as one of the primary ways a cell dies. Animal cells contain cholesterol instead of ergosterol and so they are much less susceptible. However, at therapeutic doses, some amphotericin B may bind to animal membrane cholesterol, increasing the risk of human toxicity. Amphotericin B is nephrotoxic when given intravenously. As a polyene's hydrophobic chain is shortened, its sterol binding activity is increased. Therefore, further reduction of the hydrophobic chain may result in it binding to cholesterol, making it toxic to animals.
 Amphotericin B
 Candicidin
 Filipin – 35 carbons, binds to cholesterol (toxic)
 Hamycin
 Natamycin – 33 carbons, binds well to ergosterol
 Nystatin
 Rimocidin

Azoles
Azole antifungals inhibit conversion of lanosterol to ergosterol by inhibition of lanosterol 14α-demethylase. These compounds have a five-membered ring containing two or three nitrogen atoms. The imidazole antifungals contain a 1,3-diazole (imidazole) ring (two nitrogen atoms), whereas the triazole antifungals have a ring with three nitrogen atoms.

Imidazoles
 Bifonazole
 Butoconazole
 Clotrimazole
 Econazole
 Fenticonazole
 Isoconazole
 Ketoconazole
 Luliconazole
 Miconazole
 Omoconazole
 Oxiconazole
 Sertaconazole
 Sulconazole
 Tioconazole

Triazoles
 Albaconazole
 Efinaconazole
 Epoxiconazole
 Fluconazole
 Isavuconazole
 Itraconazole
 Posaconazole
 Propiconazole
 Ravuconazole
 Terconazole
 Voriconazole

Thiazoles
 Abafungin

Allylamines
Allylamines inhibit squalene epoxidase, another enzyme required for ergosterol synthesis. Examples include butenafine, naftifine, and terbinafine.

Echinocandins
Echinocandins inhibit the creation of glucan in the fungal cell wall by inhibiting 1,3-Beta-glucan synthase:
 Anidulafungin
 Caspofungin
 Micafungin

Echinocandins are administered intravenously, particularly for the treatment of resistant Candida species.

Triterpenoids
 Ibrexafungerp

Others
 Acrisorcin
 Amorolfine – a morpholine derivative used topically in dermatophytosis
 Aurones – possess antifungal properties
 Benzoic acid – has antifungal properties, such as in Whitfield's ointment, Friar's Balsam, and Balsam of Peru
 Carbol fuchsin (Castellani's paint)
 Ciclopirox (ciclopirox olamine) – a hydroxypyridone antifungal that interferes with active membrane transport, cell membrane integrity, and fungal respiratory processes. It is most useful against tinea versicolour.
 Clioquinol
 Coal tar
 Copper(II) sulfate
 Crystal violet – a triarylmethane dye. It has antibacterial, antifungal, and anthelmintic properties and was formerly important as a topical antiseptic.
 Chlorophetanol
 Diiodohydroxyquinoline (Iodoquinol)
 Flucytosine (5-fluorocytosine) – an antimetabolite pyrimidine analog
 Fumagillin
 Griseofulvin – binds to microtubules and inhibits mitosis
 Haloprogin – discontinued due to the emergence of antifungals with fewer side effects
 Miltefosine – disrupts fungal cell membrane dynamics by interacting with ergosterol
 Nikkomycin – blocks formation of chitin present in the cell wall of fungus.
 Orotomide (F901318) – pyrimidine synthesis inhibitor
 Piroctone olamine
 Pentanenitrile
 Potassium iodide – preferred treatment for lymphocutaneous sporotrichosis and subcutaneous zygomycosis (basidiobolomycosis). The mode of action is obscure.
 Potassium permanganate - for use only on thicker, more insensitive skin such as the soles of the feet.
 Selenium disulfide
 Sodium thiosulfate
 Sulfur
 Tolnaftate – a thiocarbamate antifungal, which inhibits fungal squalene epoxidase (similar mechanism to allylamines like terbinafine)
 Triacetin – hydrolysed to acetic acid by fungal esterases
 Undecylenic acid – an unsaturated fatty acid derived from natural castor oil; fungistatic, antibacterial, antiviral, and inhibits Candida morphogenesis
 Zinc pyrithione

Side effects
Incidents of liver injury or failure among modern antifungal medicines are very low to non-existent. However, some can cause allergic reactions in people.

There are also many drug interactions. Patients must read in detail the enclosed data sheet(s) of any medicine. For example, the azole antifungals such as ketoconazole or itraconazole can be both substrates and inhibitors of the P-glycoprotein, which (among other functions) excretes toxins and drugs into the intestines. Azole antifungals also are both substrates and inhibitors of the cytochrome P450 family CYP3A4, causing increased concentration when administering, for example, calcium channel blockers, immunosuppressants, chemotherapeutic drugs, benzodiazepines, tricyclic antidepressants, macrolides and SSRIs.

Before oral antifungal therapies are used to treat nail disease, a confirmation of the fungal infection should be made. Approximately half of suspected cases of fungal infection in nails have a non-fungal cause. The side effects of oral treatment are significant and people without an infection should not take these drugs.

Azoles are the group of antifungals which act on the cell membrane of fungi. They inhibit the enzyme 14-alpha-sterol demethylase, a microsomal CYP, which is required for biosynthesis of ergosterol for the cytoplasmic membrane. This leads to the accumulation of 14-alpha-methylsterols resulting in impairment of function of certain membrane-bound enzymes and disruption of close packing of acyl chains of phospholipids, thus inhibiting growth of the fungi. Some azoles directly increase permeability of the fungal cell membrane.

See also
 Fungicide
 Antimicrobial
 Etest

References

External links
 Antifungal Drugs – Detailed information on antifungals from the Fungal Guide written by R. Thomas and K. Barber
 

 
Anti-infective agents
.